Mesolita antennalis is a species of beetle in the family Cerambycidae. It was described by Carter in 1929. It is known from Australia.

References

Parmenini
Beetles described in 1929